

Incumbents

Head of state: King: Letsie III (since February 7, 1996)
Head of government: Prime Minister: Tom Thabane (June 16, 2017 to 20 May 2020), Moeketsi Majoro (since 20 May 2020).

Events

February 6 – Lesotho's First Lady, Maesiah Thabane is arrested for murdering her predecessor, Lipolelo Thabane in 2017.
February 20 – Former prime minister Thomas Thabane, 80, of Lesotho is to be charged with his wife's 2017 murder.
March 11 – Moshoeshoe Day, Lesotho
April 18 – Prime Minister Thomas Thabane deploys the army to the streets of Lesotho to restore order.
April 30 – COVID-19 pandemic: Lesotho is the only African country that has not reported the virus.
May 8 – Lesotho Prime Minister Thomas Thabane will step down in July as the country's leader.
May 13 – COVID-19 pandemic: Lesotho report its first case of the virus, becoming the last country in Africa to do so.
May 20 - Moeketsi Majoro replaces Thomas Thabane as Prime Minister of Lesotho.

Births

Deaths

References

 
2020s in Lesotho
Years of the 21st century in Lesotho
Lesotho